The 1982 Mexico City WCT was a men's tennis tournament played on indoor carpet courts in Mexico City, Mexico. The event was part of the 1982 World Championship Tennis circuit. It was the fourth and last edition of the tournament and was held from 19 January until 24 January 1982. Unseeded Tomáš Šmíd won the singles title.

Finals

Singles
 Tomáš Šmíd defeated  John Sadri, 3–6, 7–6, 4–6, 7–6, 6–2
 It was Šmíd's 1st singles title of the year and the 5th of his career.

Doubles
 Ferdi Taygan /  Sherwood Stewart defeated  Tomáš Šmíd /  Balázs Taróczy, 6–4, 7–5

See also
 1982 Monterrey Cup

References

External links
 ITF tournament edition details

Mexico City
Mex
Mexico City WCT